Michael A. "Doc" Rhett (born December 30, 1956) is an American politician. He is a member of the Georgia State Senate from the 33rd District, serving since 2015. He is a member of the Democratic party.

References

External links
 Profile at the Georgia State Senate
 Official website

1956 births
21st-century American politicians
Democratic Party Georgia (U.S. state) state senators
Living people
People from Harlem